Katie Robinson (born 8 August 2002) is an English professional footballer who plays as a forward for FA WSL club Brighton & Hove Albion.

Club career

Bristol City
Robinson came through the ranks at the Bristol City academy. She made her senior debut for Bristol City on 14 October 2019 as an 83rd-minute substitute for Juliette Kemppi in a 1–0 loss to Birmingham City in the WSL. Robinson scored her first senior career goal on 5 December 2018 during a 5–2 victory over second-tier side Aston Villa in the League Cup. After two seasons, Robinson declined a contract extension with Bristol and departed at the end of the 2019–20 season.

Brighton & Hove Albion
On 13 July 2020, Robinson joined Brighton & Hove Albion, signing her first professional contract in the process. In September 2020, Robinson sustained an anterior cruciate ligament injury during training. This meant that she missed the rest of the 2020–21 season.

International career

Youth career 
Robinson has represented England at under-17 level. Robinson made her England U17 debut on 19 September 2018 as a 67th minute substitution for Fran Stables during 2019 UEFA Women's Under-17 Championship qualification, scoring England's third goal in a 6–0 win against Moldova in Chișinău.

Senior career
Robinson received her first call-up to the England senior squad in November 2022 for fixtures against Japan and Norway. She made her debut as an 83rd-minute substitute against Norway on 15 November 2022.Robinson was named in the England senior squad squad in February 2023 for the Arnold Clark Cup.

Career statistics

Club
.

International
Statistics accurate as of match played 19 February 2022.

Honours 
England

 Arnold Clark Cup: 2023

References 

English women's footballers
Living people
Bristol City W.F.C. players
Brighton & Hove Albion W.F.C. players
Women's Super League players
2002 births
Women's association football midfielders
England women's international footballers
England women's youth international footballers